Muhammad Iqbal (born 27 October 2000) is an Indonesian professional footballer who plays as a midfielder for Liga 1 club Persebaya Surabaya.

Club career

Persika Karawang 
Muhammad Iqbal joined Persika Karawang on 23 April 2018. He was brought in by Ricky Nelson to navigate 2018 Liga 2. He made 2 league appearances for Persika Karawang.

PSMS Medan
Iqbal joined PSMS Medan to add to the squad list of young players owned by the team nicknamed the "Ayam Kinantan" to navigate the 2019 Liga 2. He made 6 league appearances for PSMS Medan.

Cheongju FC
On 15 September 2021, Iqbal made his debut in a match against Gimpo Citizen, coming on as a substitute in the 84th minute for Kwon Seung-cheol. He made 3 league appearances for Cheongju.

Persita Tangerang
He was signed for Persita Tangerang to play in the Liga 1 in the 2021-22 middle season. Iqbal made his league debut on 7 January 2022 in a match against Persib Bandung at the Ngurah Rai Stadium, Denpasar.

Persebaya Surabaya
On 3 January 2023, Iqbal signed a contract with Liga 1 club Persebaya Surabaya from Persita Tangerang. Iqbal made his league debut for the club in a 5–0 win against Persita Tangerang, coming on as a substituted Sho Yamamoto.

International career
On 31 May 2017, Iqbal made his debut against Brazil U20 in the 2017 Toulon Tournament in France. And Iqbal is one of the players that strengthen  Indonesia U19 in 2017 AFF U-18 Youth Championship. He scored his first International goal at 2017 AFF U-18 Youth Championship in a 9–0 win against Philippines U-19.

Personal life
He is the older brother of Ikhsan Zikrak, who also a footballer and currently plays as a midfielder for RANS Nusantara. Syamsuddin Batubara is his father as well as his first coach to start his career as a footballer. his father is the founder of the Soccer School of Football Association of Kudugantiang in Padang Pariaman.

Career statistics

Club

Honours

International 
Indonesia U-19
 AFF U-19 Youth Championship third place: 2017

References

External links
 

2000 births
Living people
Indonesian footballers
Liga 2 (Indonesia) players
K3 League players
Liga 1 (Indonesia) players
PSMS Medan players
Persita Tangerang players
Persebaya Surabaya players
Indonesia youth international footballers
Indonesia international footballers
Association football midfielders
People from Padang Pariaman Regency
Sportspeople from West Sumatra
Indonesian expatriate footballers
Expatriate footballers in South Korea